|}

This is a list of House of Assembly results for the 2014 Tasmanian election.

Results by Division

Bass

Braddon

Denison

Franklin

Lyons

See also 

 2014 Tasmanian state election
 Candidates of the 2014 Tasmanian state election
 Members of the Tasmanian House of Assembly, 2014–2018

References 

Results of Tasmanian elections